Hogsnort Rupert is a New Zealand pop rock band.  Formed in 1968 as Hogsnort Rupert's Original Flagon Band, the name was shortened in 1970 after the second album.  Hogsnort Rupert became one of the longest-running bands in New Zealand music history.

Hogsnort Rupert is known for its light, humorous brand of music.  It produced several charting singles, including the number one Pretty Girl, which became its biggest-selling single in New Zealand for 1970.

History 
The two consistent band members had been; Alec Wishart (lead vocals, percussion) and Dave Luther (vocals, guitar, harmonica). Luther was also the composer of all their hit singles.  The band's early manager was John MacGee.

During the Original Flagon Band period, the band members beside Wishart and Luther were Ian Terry (vocals, guitar), Frank Boardman (bass) whose idea the band was, and Billy Such (drums). However, the last three musicians left the band in 1970.   Hogsnort Rupert then included Wishart, Boardman and John Reilly (vocals, guitar).

Reilly left Hogsnort Rupert before its third album was released.  That album was recorded by Wishart and Luther. Later Hogsnort Rupert musicians included; John Newton, Graham Brown, Neil Worboys, Kevin Findlater, Bernie Reber, Dean Ruscoe, and Graeme Luther.

In November 2010, Hogsnort Rupert  celebrated its 40th anniversary with two live concerts in Napier. Boardman died in Sussex, England, on 6 October 2015. Wishart  died on 22 January 2016 at age 76 from lung cancer.

Discography

Albums

Extended plays

Singles

Note: This Discography also includes acts associated to Hogsnort Rupert primary members; Alec Wishart and Dave Luther. Those entries are indicated with (*)

References

External links
Hogsnort Rupert @ Sergent
Hogsnort Rupert @ Old New Zealand
Hogsnort Rupert @ Audio Culture

New Zealand pop rock groups